Bhishma Narain Singh (13 July 1933 – 1 August 2018) was an Indian politician who served as the Governor of Assam from 1984 to 1989 and Governor of Tamil Nadu from 1991 to 1993.

Life Sketch
Singh was born in a family of modest agriculturist means in a village in Jharkhand (Udaigarh, Palamau District) on 13 July 1933 and graduated from Benaras Hindu University. He was a member of All India Congress Committee (AICC) for more than three decades and was a permanent invitee of the Congress Parliamentary Board from 1978 to 1983 under the Presidency of Mrs. Indira Gandhi. Currently, his grandson Kranti Pratap Singh is active politician from Hussainabad.

 1967:     Member of Legislative Assembly of Bihar State.
 1971:     Bihar State Minister for Education.
 1972:     Bihar State Minister for Mines & Geology.
 1973:     Bihar State Minister for Food, Supply & Commerce.
 1976:     Elected to Rajya Sabha (Upper House of Indian Parliament).
 1978:     Chief Whip of Congress Party in Parliament.
 1980:     Cabinet Minister of Parliamentary Affairs, Works and Housing & Labor and Communications in Mrs. Indira Gandhi's Government.
 1983:     Cabinet Minister for Food and Civil Supplies in Mrs. Indira Gandhi's Prime Minister-ship.
 1984:     Governor of Assam & Meghalaya and Chairman of North Eastern Council. Additional charge as Governor of Sikkim in 1985 and Arunachal Pradesh in 1987.
 1991:     Governor of Tamil Nadu along with additional charge of Pondicherry and Andaman and Nicobar Islands.

Services rendered to the nation:
•	As Governor of Tamil Nadu in President's Rule restored critical law and order situation and ensured smooth functioning of democratic progress and simultaneously improving the economic situation as well.

•	As chairman of North Eastern Council covered the administration of the seven sisters North Indian States (Namely Assam, Manipur, Tripura, Mizoram, Nagaland, Meghalaya & Arunachal Pradesh) during which economic as well as social development was accelerated & was primordial to transforming the profile of the region, ensuring a better quality of life to the people. Social reforms & tribal welfare rights got implemented.

•	In Assam as governor, pacified the social & political agitations, leading to the signing of the Historic Assam Accord between the Central & State Governments and Assam Students' Union (conflict resolution).

•	As Cabinet Minister Works & Housing, associated with the establishment of Sports Infrastructure for holding the IX Asian Games in New Delhi, and ensuring its completion in record time (1980–1982).

•	Chancellor of 2 (two) dozen universities in India during tenure as governor of several states. Ensured qualitative improvements in education and related facilities. Promotion of women's rights.

Membership:
 Associate Life Member of the Inter Parliamentary Union, Indian Branch.
 Associate Life Member of the Commonwealth Parliamentary Association in India.
 President of Unity International Foundation.
 President of All India Conference of Intellectuals.

Awards
Recipient of Several National and International Awards. Medal of Merit and Certificate of Honor by Government of Algeria in April, 2005 and latest being the highest Award of Russian Federation "Order of Friendship" in April 2009.

Personal Details:

Widely travelled throughout Asia, Europe, some African countries and U.S.A.

Interests:
Enjoyed brisk morning walk, horse riding and tribal folk place.

 Visited Foreign Countries on Invitation after Demitting Office as governor
 Visited Macedonia on the invitation of the Vice President of the Assembly Mr. Kiropopoviski in April 1994.
 Visited Yugoslavia on the invitation of the President of the Chamber of Citizens of the Federal Assembly of the Republic of Yugoslavia Dr. Rodoman Bozovic in July 1994.
 Visited Bahrain in February 1996 on the Special invitation of the Government of Bahrain to attend NRI's Conference.
 May 1998 visited Kazakhstan on the invitation of the President of Kazakhstan.
 Invited to attend the World Bhojpuri Conference as a Special Guest held in Mauritius in February 2000.
 Visited Yugoslavia as International Observer to monitor the election of the President, XXXX Federal Assembly and the bodies of local self - rule of Serbia scheduled for 24 September 2000 onwards on the invitation of the Chairman of the Foreign Affairs Committee.
 Visited China on the invitation of External Cultural Relations of Ministry of Culture People's Republic of China in May 2001.
 Visited Bhutan on the invitation of the Govt. of Bhutan through the Ambassador of Bhutan in New Delhi in September 2002.
 Visited China on the invitation of the Chinese People's Association for Friendship with Foreign Countries in May 2004.
 Visited Seoul, South Korea on the invitation of the International Federation of Agricultural Producers (IFAP) in May 2006.
 Visited UK on the invitation of NRI's Society London Chapter and addressed the NRI's in October 2006.
 Visited Stuttgart (Germany) on the invitation of Mercedes Benz Museum Asia Circle as Chief Guest and addressed 300 (three hundred) delegates on India's rich cultural heritage of religious tolerance in 2007.
 Visited UK on the invitation of British Institute of Technology & E-commerce in October 2008.
 Visited Moscow on the invitation of the Government of Russia to attend Public Dialogue on 18 November 2009.

References

External links
 Profile of Singh Bhishma Narain at Rajya Sabha website.

Governors of Tamil Nadu
Governors of Assam
1933 births
2018 deaths
Rajya Sabha members from Bihar
Governors of Meghalaya
People from Palamu district
Indian National Congress politicians